N,N'-diacetylbacillosaminyl-diphospho-undecaprenol alpha-1,3-N-acetylgalactosaminyltransferase (PglA) is an enzyme with systematic name UDP-N-acetyl-alpha-D-galactosamine:N,N'-diacetyl-alpha-D-bacillosaminyl-diphospho-tritrans,heptacis-undecaprenol 3-alpha-N-acetyl-D-galactosaminyltransferase. This enzyme catalyses the following chemical reaction

 UDP-N-acetyl-alpha-D-galactosamine + N,N'-diacetyl-alpha-D-bacillosaminyl-diphospho-tritrans,heptacis-undecaprenol  UDP + N-acetyl-D-galactosaminyl-alpha-(1->3)-N,N'-diacetyl-alpha-D-bacillosaminyl-diphospho-tritrans,heptacis-undecaprenol

This enzyme is isolated from Campylobacter jejuni.

References

External links 

EC 2.4.1